ATI Physical Therapy is an American provider of physical therapy services based in Bolingbrook, Illinois. Founded by exercise physiologist Greg Steil in 1996 as one clinic in Willowbrook, Illinois, ATI has more than 900 locations in the United States. ATI  specializes in research-based physical therapy, workers' compensation rehab, employer worksite solutions, sports medicine, and other specialty therapies. ATI Physical Therapy was listed as a Great Place to Work for 2019–2020. It is the largest physical therapy company under one brand name in the US. ATI Physical Therapy became a publicly traded company in June, 2021. 
ATI Physical Therapy is rated 3.4 out of 5 from more than 1,000 reviews by current and former employees on Glassdoor. (The average company rating on Glassdoor is 3.5 on the 5-point scale.)

Personnel
Sharon Vitti was hired as CEO in April 2022. Ray Wahl is the chief operating officer. Joseph Jordan is chief financial officer for the organization.

References

External links

See also
Athletico Physical Therapy

Rehabilitation medicine
Physical therapy
Sports medicine
Bolingbrook, Illinois
1996 establishments in Illinois
Health care companies established in 1996